Manuel Koll (born 14 September 1987) is an Austrian former competitive figure skater. He is a two-time (2007 & 2008) Austrian national champion and reached the free skate at two ISU Championships — the 2007 World Junior Championships in Oberstdorf and the 2008 European Championships in Zagreb. He is coached by his mother, Ursula Koll, who competed internationally as a pair skater.

Programs

Competitive highlights
CS: Challenger Series; JGP: Junior Grand Prix

References

External links
 

1987 births
Living people
People from Vöcklabruck
Austrian male single skaters
Sportspeople from Upper Austria
Competitors at the 2015 Winter Universiade
Competitors at the 2009 Winter Universiade
Competitors at the 2013 Winter Universiade